Victoria Nyanjura (born circa 1982) is a Ugandan community activist, who is the founder of Women in Action for Women (WAW), a Ugandan-based non-governmental organization, that attempts to improve the lives of young people and women through vocational training,  business education and guidance in accessing community and government services.

Background and education
Nyanjura was born in Oyam District, in the Lango sub-region, in the Northern Region of Uganda. She attended primary school locally. She obtained her High School Diploma from St. Mary's College Aboke, in Kole District.

Her first degree, a Bachelor of Development Studies, was obtained from Kyambogo University, in Kampala, Uganda's capital city. As of February 2020, she is pursuing a Master of Global Affairs, specializing in International Peace Studies at the University of Notre Dame. She also holds a Postgraduate Diploma in Monitoring and Evaluation, awarded by Uganda Management Institute, also in Kampala.

Career
Nyanjura worked as a volunteer at the Justice & Reconciliation Project, a non-governmental organization that aims at rehabilitation war-ravaged communities in Northern Uganda, based in the city of Gulu. She later became an employee at the NGO, in its Gender Justice department. She has also worked at International Justice Mission, another NGO, focused on protecting Ugandan widows on property ownership.

Other considerations
In 1996, at the age of 14 years, Nyanjura was one of the 139 girls abducted from St. Mary's College Aboke on 10 October 1996, by rebels of the Lord's Resistance Army. The deputy headmistress of the college, Sister Rachele Fassera of Italy, pursued the rebels and successfully negotiated the release of 109 of the girls. 30 of the girls were retained by the rebels. Nyanjura was one of the 30. After eight years in captivity, characterized by torture and sexual abuse, she was able to escape and regain her freedom in 2004.

Recognition and awards
In 2018, she was the recipient of the Navarra International Solidarity Award, organized by the Government of Navarre, Spain, and Laboral Kutxa, a Spanish credit union. The award recognizes individuals, NGOs, and institutions whose work advances the United Nations Sustainable Development Goals. She shared the award, and a €25,000 prize with three other African women, Hulo Guillabert, Theresa Kachindamoto and Oumou Sall-Seck. The group was nominated by the Spanish diplomatic organization Casa África.

See also
Angela Atim Lakor
List of kidnappings
List of solved missing person cases

References

External links
Brief Profile of Victoria Nyanjura

1982 births
1990s missing person cases
20th-century Ugandan people
21st-century Ugandan people
20th-century Ugandan women
21st-century Ugandan women
Formerly missing people
Kidnapped Ugandan children
Kyambogo University alumni
Langi people
Living people
Missing person cases in Uganda
People from Northern Region, Uganda
People from Oyam District
Uganda Management Institute alumni
Ugandan activists
University of Notre Dame alumni
Women's rights in Uganda